Ibrox, from the Scottish Gaelic term for badger den, may refer to:

Ibrox, Glasgow, a district of the city of Glasgow in western Scotland
Ibrox Stadium, the home of Rangers Football Club
1902 Ibrox disaster
1971 Ibrox disaster
Ibrox Park (1887–99), previous home ground of Rangers F.C.
Ibrox railway station, closed 1967
Ibrox subway station, part of the Glasgow subway system
Ibrox Primary School